Samir Abdellaoui is the governor of Bizerte, the northernmost governorate in Tunisia. He was appointed by President Kais Saied following the removal of his predecessor from office, Mohamed Gouider, by the presidential decree number 102/2021, on 12 August 2021.

Education 
Samir Abdellaoui has a license in judicial sciences from the University of Tunis.

Personal life 
Abdellaoui was born in 1980. He is married and has one son. He is from Awled haffouz, Sidi Bouzid.

References 

Governors of Tunisian governorates
Tunis University alumni
People from Sidi Bouzid
1980 births
Living people